L'Albiol is a municipality in the comarca of Baix Camp, in the province of Tarragona, Catalonia, Spain.

The Prades Mountains are located within the municipal term of the town. 
The 1791 church is dedicated to Saint Michael.

See also
Prades Mountains

References

Tomàs Bonell, Jordi; Descobrir Catalunya, poble a poble, Prensa Catalana, Barcelona, 1994

External links

L'Albiol Town Hall webpage
 Government data pages 

Municipalities in Baix Camp
Populated places in Baix Camp